Tuam Cathedral can refer to either of the two cathedrals in Tuam:
Cathedral of the Assumption of the Blessed Virgin Mary, Tuam, belonging to the Roman Catholic Church
St Mary's Cathedral, Tuam, belonging to the Church of Ireland